The Samsung Galaxy Folder is a smartphone released in 2015 exclusively to the Korean market. The phone is considered unusual for being both a smartphone and a flip phone.

References 

Samsung Galaxy
Android (operating system) devices
Flip phones
Samsung smartphones
Mobile phones introduced in 2015